Larry or Lawrence Grossman may refer to:

 Larry Grossman (politician) (1943–1997), politician in Ontario, Canada
 Larry Grossman (composer) (born 1938), composer of Broadway musicals
Lawrence Grossman (geochemist), see Meanings of minor planet names: 4001–5000
Lawrence K. Grossman (1931-2018), American television executive